Capua zapyrrha is a species of moth of the family Tortricidae. It is found on Samoa in the south-western Pacific Ocean.

References

Moths described in 1936
Capua (moth)